Jalil Bagheri Jeddi is a paralympic athlete from Iran competing mainly in category F55 shot and discus events.

Jalil competed in the shot put and discus at the 2004 Summer Paralympics winning a silver in the later event.  In 2008 he competed in the shot put but could only manage twelfth place.
 However, Jalil succeeded in obtaining the first gold medal for Iran in the 2012 Paralympic Games held in London.

References

Paralympic athletes of Iran
Athletes (track and field) at the 2004 Summer Paralympics
Athletes (track and field) at the 2008 Summer Paralympics
Athletes (track and field) at the 2012 Summer Paralympics
Paralympic silver medalists for Iran
Living people
People from Ardabil
Medalists at the 2004 Summer Paralympics
Medalists at the 2008 Summer Paralympics
Medalists at the 2012 Summer Paralympics
Paralympic gold medalists for Iran
Year of birth missing (living people)
Paralympic medalists in athletics (track and field)
Iranian male discus throwers
Iranian male shot putters
20th-century Iranian people
21st-century Iranian people
Wheelchair discus throwers
Wheelchair shot putters
Paralympic discus throwers
Paralympic shot putters
Medalists at the 2010 Asian Para Games
Medalists at the 2014 Asian Para Games
Medalists at the 2018 Asian Para Games